Eric Roberts (born April 18, 1956) is an American actor. His career began with King of the Gypsies (1978), earning a Golden Globe Award nomination for Best Actor Debut. He earned both a Golden Globe and Academy Award nomination for his supporting role in Runaway Train (1985).

Through the 1990s and 2000s, he maintained dramatic film and TV film roles while appearing in TV series. His TV work includes playing the Master in the 1996 Doctor Who TV Movie, 
three seasons with the sitcom Less than Perfect and a recurring role on the NBC drama Heroes.

His sisters Julia Roberts and Lisa Roberts Gillan, and daughter Emma Roberts, also have acting careers.

To date, Roberts has made appearances in over 700 different productions, making him the third-most prolific screen actor of all time.

Film

Television

Music videos

Audio dramas

References

External links
 

Male actor filmographies
American filmographies
Eric